Sedini is a comune (municipality) in the Province of Sassari in the Italian region Sardinia, located about  north of Cagliari and about  northeast of Sassari.  It is part of the Anglona traditional subregion.

Sedini borders the following municipalities: Bulzi, Castelsardo, Laerru, Nulvi, Santa Maria Coghinas, Tergu, Valledoria.

Main sights
Church of San Nicola di Silanis,  built before 1122

References

Cities and towns in Sardinia